Nymeo Field at Harry Grove Stadium, located in Frederick, Maryland, is the home of the Frederick Keys, a collegiate summer baseball team of the MLB Draft League. Opened in 1990, it seats 5,400 fans.

History

The stadium is named for Harry Grove, who was one of the founders of the Frederick Hustlers, a professional team that existed between 1915 and the World War II era.  The Grove family also donated $250,000 to the city to help build the park and were thus honored in the naming of it.  Another $1 million was provided by the city of Frederick along with $1.5 million provided by the state of Maryland and $250,000 from Frederick County.

The 2005 Class A all-star game, pitting the Carolina League against the California League, was played in Harry Grove Stadium.

Harry Grove Stadium has also hosted various concerts.  On August 19, 2006, Bob Dylan played to a sell-out crowd during his third annual 'Summer Minor League Baseball Park Tour'. The World Wrestling Entertainment (WWE) has made it an annual summer stop on its live event tours, a rarity in that the stadium is an outdoor venue.

Harry Grove Stadium also serves host to several autocross clubs, who use the lower lot for their autocross course.

In 1998, the stadium hosted the Frederick Regiment, a team in the single-season Maryland Fall Baseball league. The yet unnamed Frederick team of the Atlantic League of Professional Baseball will play here beginning in April 2023.

Renovations
In 2006, Keys ownership began a project to revitalize Harry Grove Stadium. Renovations have included a new field, seating section, suite level restoration and a new lighting system.

A new state-of-the-art scoreboard and videoboard and brand new audio visual equipment was in place for the 2009 season. The scoreboard has an all new LED technology speed of pitch, clock and full color high resolution LED message center. The State-of-the-Art videoboard is 50% larger than its predecessor and supports HD video input for a cleaner, crisper image.

Further upgrades include public restrooms that have been completely renovated along with those in the clubhouse, and multiple improvements to bring Harry Grove Stadium into compliance with the Americans with Disabilities Act.

Naming rights
On December 5, 2013, the Frederick Mayor and Board of Aldermen approved an amended contract that will allow the Frederick Keys to seek a sponsor for stadium naming rights while retaining "Harry Grove" as part of the name.  Mayor Randy McClement said, "The stadium is always going to be Harry Grove Stadium. But the idea behind naming rights is to look at portions of the stadium that could used for naming rights."  The city will get 35% of the net profit from the naming fees with the remainder going to the team. On February 5, 2015, the Frederick Keys announced a deal had been reached with Nymeo Federal Credit Union to use the name "Nymeo Field at Harry Grove Stadium."<ref name="Keys-Nymeo Naming rights">

References

External links

1990 establishments in Maryland
Sports venues completed in 1990
Atlantic League of Professional Baseball ballparks
Baseball venues in Maryland
Buildings and structures in Frederick County, Maryland
Tourist attractions in Frederick County, Maryland
Sports in Frederick, Maryland